The 2000 Pepsi 400 was the 17th stock car race of the 2000 NASCAR Winston Cup Series and the 42nd iteration of the event. The race was held on Saturday, July 1, 2000, in Daytona Beach, Florida at Daytona International Speedway, a 2.5 miles (4.0 km) permanent triangular-shaped superspeedway. The race took the scheduled 160 laps to complete. At race's end, Jeff Burton, driving for Roush Racing, would fiercely defend the lead on the final restart with four to go to win a chaotic race. The win was Burton's 13th career NASCAR Winston Cup Series win and his second of the season. To fill out the podium, Dale Jarrett of Robert Yates Racing and Rusty Wallace of Penske-Kranefuss Racing would finish second and third, respectively.

Background 

Daytona International Speedway is one of three superspeedways to hold NASCAR races, the other two being Indianapolis Motor Speedway and Talladega Superspeedway. The standard track at Daytona International Speedway is a four-turn superspeedway that is 2.5 miles (4.0 km) long. The track's turns are banked at 31 degrees, while the front stretch, the location of the finish line, is banked at 18 degrees.

Entry list 

 (R) denotes rookie driver.

Practice

First practice 
The first practice session was held on Thursday, June 29, and was delayed until 5:00 PM EST due to rain. The session lasted for around an hour and 30 minutes.

Second practice 
The second practice session was held on Friday, June 30, at 3:00 PM EST. The session would last for two hours and 30 minutes.

Third and final practice 
The third and final practice session, sometimes referred to as Happy Hour, was held on Friday, June 30, at 8:00 PM EST. The session would last for one hour.

Qualifying 
Qualifying was split into two rounds. The first round was held on Friday, June 29, at 8:00 PM EST. Each driver would have two laps to set a fastest time; the fastest of the two would count as their official qualifying lap. During the first round, the top 25 drivers in the round would be guaranteed a starting spot in the race. If a driver was not able to guarantee a spot in the first round, they had the option to scrub their time from the first round and try and run a faster lap time in a second round qualifying run, held on Saturday, June 30, at 6:30 PM EST. As with the first round, each driver would have two laps to set a fastest time; the fastest of the two would count as their official qualifying lap. Positions 26-36 would be decided on time, while positions 37-43 would be based on provisionals. Six spots are awarded by the use of provisionals based on owner's points. The seventh is awarded to a past champion who has not otherwise qualified for the race. If no past champion needs the provisional, the next team in the owner points will be awarded a provisional.

Three drivers would fail to qualify: Brett Bodine, Robby Gordon, and Dave Marcis. Ted Musgrave and Boris Said had withdrawn from the entry list earlier in the week.

Full qualifying results

Race results

References 

2000 NASCAR Winston Cup Series
NASCAR races at Daytona International Speedway
July 2000 sports events in the United States
2000 in sports in Florida